Mohamed Tazman Tahir is a former Malaysian international lawn bowler.

Bowls career
Tahir won the bronze medal in the pairs with Mohamed Aziz Maswadi at the 1998 Commonwealth Games in Kuala Lumpur. In 1999, he won the gold medal in the pairs event at the 1999 Southeast Asian Games in Bandar Seri Begawan.

He won the fours bronze medal at the 2001 Asia Pacific Bowls Championships, in Melbourne. He won a second gold medal at the 2001 South East Asian Games.

References

Living people
Malaysian male bowls players
Bowls players at the 1998 Commonwealth Games
Commonwealth Games medallists in lawn bowls
Commonwealth Games bronze medallists for Malaysia
Year of birth missing (living people)
Southeast Asian Games medalists in lawn bowls
Competitors at the 1999 Southeast Asian Games
Competitors at the 2001 Southeast Asian Games
Southeast Asian Games gold medalists for Malaysia
Medallists at the 1998 Commonwealth Games